Santilly is a commune in the Eure-et-Loir department in northern France. Château-Gaillard station has rail connections to Orléans, Étampes and Paris.

Population

See also
Communes of the Eure-et-Loir department

References

Communes of Eure-et-Loir